Adéla Bruns, née Sýkorová (born 5 February 1987) is a Czech sports shooter. She competed at the 2008 Summer Olympics and in both the Women's 10 metre air rifle and Women's 50 metre rifle three positions events at the 2012 Summer Olympics. In the latter event, she won the bronze medal.

Olympic results

References

External links
 

1987 births
Living people
Czech female sport shooters
Olympic shooters of the Czech Republic
Shooters at the 2008 Summer Olympics
Shooters at the 2012 Summer Olympics
Shooters at the 2016 Summer Olympics
Olympic bronze medalists for the Czech Republic
Olympic medalists in shooting
Sportspeople from Zlín
Medalists at the 2012 Summer Olympics
Shooters at the 2015 European Games
European Games competitors for the Czech Republic
Universiade medalists in shooting
Universiade gold medalists for the Czech Republic